Gary Marsh was President and Chief Creative Officer for Disney Branded Television, where he used to develop and produce Disney Channel Original Series, Disney Channel Original Movies and Disney Junior Series (formerly Playhouse Disney). He also oversaw talent and casting operations for Disney Channel. Marsh joined Disney Channel in July 1988 as executive director, Original Programming. He was made Vice President eight months later and in 1994, became Senior Vice President. In 1999, he was promoted to Executive Vice President and in 2001, Marsh assumed the role of Executive Vice President, Original Programming and Production, Disney Channel. In 2005, he was promoted to President, Entertainment, Disney Channels Worldwide and in 2009 he assumed the role as Chief Creative Officer, Disney Channels Worldwide before being promoted to President and Chief Creative Officer, Disney Channels Worldwide in 2011. In 2021, Marsh made an overall deal with Disney.

References

Year of birth missing (living people)
American television executives
Living people
Disney executives
Presidents of Disney Channel